A logbook (or log book) is a record used to record states, events, or conditions applicable to complex machines or the personnel who operate them.  Logbooks are commonly associated with the operation of aircraft, nuclear plants, particle accelerators, and ships (among other applications).  The term logbook originated with the ship's log—a maritime record of important events in the management, operation, and navigation of a ship. Originally, the term "Log Book" came about in early maritime navigation.  The Captain was responsible for keeping a 'Log', as a minimum, of navigational wind, speed, direction and position.  The speed was determined by ejecting a 'log' from the bow of the boat and measuring the time it took to reach the stern, thereby determining the speed.

Format 
Logbooks come in many varieties, but they are sometimes standardized in form and/or content within certain organizations or industries. In some applications like flight training or trucking hours of service, they  contain specific information used to satisfy legal requirements.

Electronic logbooks 
Prior to the advent of mobile computing, logbooks were almost exclusively printed and bound in hard copy form.  While physical logbooks offer advantages in frontline applications with many users (like aircraft maintenance logs), the proliferation of cloud computing and mobile devices has enabled the development of electronic logbooks.  They may be as complex as software packages, or as simple as editable spreadsheets, but electronic logbooks offer several advantages—like virtually unlimited capacity and digital backups.

Applications

Maritime logbooks 
To record key navigation, engine watch, port calls and other operational activities on board vessels of all sizes, marine logbooks must meet the specific reporting requirements of IMO, SOLAS and flag states. When maritime logbooks are of the electronic variety, manually-inserted information is normally combined with data recorded from the vessel's instruments such as time and position. Typical marine logbooks are:

 Deck logbook – Records navigational events related to the voyage and operations on board
 Dynamic positioning logbook – Manual recording of operations related to Dynamic Positioning (DP) operations
 Engine logbook – Records engine events related to the engine and machinery operation
 Oil record book – Records events related to oil and dirty water as required by IMO's MARPOL convention
 Operational log – Records events related to vessel operation, i.e. performance, cargo handling and maritime operations. The Operational Log will typically need some customisation to owner's requirement and trade.
 Radio logbook – Records events relevant to radio traffic as required by IMO and the flag states

Shift logbooks 
On any industrial site, there is a continuous stream of operational, maintenance and safety events occurring at all levels and areas within the process.  An electronic shift logbook is used at power plants and in process industry where several shift teams cooperate in maintaining production. Typically the electronic shift logbook is used to record state at the production plant, but it can also contain simple planning functions that notify personnel about upcoming maintenance activities. Compared to the paper logbook the electronic shift logbook enhance the value of the gathered information through;

 Search functions
 Defined plant hierarchy for registration of logbook entries
 Classification according to certain entry types
 Statistics about most problematic areas
 Management reports

Additionally, access to the information storage can be controlled through user authentication and authorizations mechanisms.

Other applications 
It has since been applied to a variety of other uses, including:
 Aircraft pilots must maintain a pilot logbook to record their time spent flying and in a simulator. In addition, aircraft operators must maintain an aircraft technical logbook (or "techlog") recording the aircraft's flights, maintenance and defects.
 In a project, a logbook is a recording which is compiled while it is being done may be called a project diary. In the PRINCE2 project management framework, daily logs are used to record issues, actions or events not caught by other types of registers or logs within the framework. Examples of other logs or registers in PRINCE2 include the lessons log, risk register, issue register, quality register or backlog.
 In skydiving, a logbook serves as a parachutist's personal history in the sport and also serves as an identifying document. It also provides drop zones proof to back one's skydiving licenses, ratings and currency.
 In scuba diving, the dive log documents the experience of a diver by logging a diver's dives.
 In the fishing industry, a logbook is used to record catch data as part of the fisheries regulations. It is then submitted to the fishing authorities of the vessel's flag state.
 For amateur radio, the logbook is where the hams register their contacts and other radio operations. There are several programs to help radio operators in the management of their logbook.
 For commercial vehicles: In Canada, the United States, New Zealand and other countries, a logbook is used to register driver and operator work time for commercial heavy vehicles. In the United States hours of service are recorded in a logbook. In New Zealand it is referred to as work-time.
 In the United Kingdom, a vehicle registration certificate (V5C) and service history is often referred to as a "logbook".
 A race car log book is a document certifying that a car is prepared to a given set of rules and is safe for competitions.
 Lab notebooks and electronic lab notebooks are used in research and scientific settings.

See also

 Inventor's notebook
 Service book (disambiguation)
 Timesheet

References

Records management